Urotricha antarctica is a species of littoral ciliates, first found near King George Island.

References

Further reading
Wilbert, Norbert. "Species composition and structure of the ciliate community in the benthos at King George Island, Antarctica." The Antarctic ecosystem of Potter Cove, King-George Island (Isla 25 de Mayo) Synopsis of research performed 1999-2006 at the Dallmann Laboratory and Jubany Station _: 141.
Vincent, W. F., and M. R. James. "Biodiversity in extreme aquatic environments: lakes, ponds and streams of the Ross Sea sector, Antarctica." Biodiversity & Conservation 5.11 (1996): 1451-1471.
Weisse, Thomas, and David JS Montagnes. "Effect of temperature on inter-and intraspecific isolates of Urotricha (Prostomatida, Ciliophora)." Aquatic microbial ecology 15.3 (1998): 285-291.

External links

Species described in 2008
Intramacronucleata